The Minister of Foreign Affairs and Cooperation is a senior member of the Constitutional Government of East Timor heading the Ministry of Foreign Affairs and Cooperation.

Functions
Under the Constitution of East Timor, the Minister has the power and the duty:

Where the Minister is in charge of the subject matter of a government statute, the Minister is also required, together with the Prime Minister, to sign the statute.

History
In the 1975 Council of Ministers, and also in the I UNTAET Transitional Government (2000–2001), the title of the Minister was "Minister of Foreign Affairs". When the II UNTAET Transitional Government took office on 20 September 2001, the title was changed to Minister of Foreign Affairs and Cooperation.

Incumbent
The incumbent Minister of Foreign Affairs and Cooperation is Adaljíza Magno. She is assisted by Julião da Silva, Deputy Minister of Foreign Affairs and Cooperation.

List of Ministers 
The following individuals have been appointed as the Minister:

References

Notes

Bibliography

External links
  – official site  (inactive )

 
Foreign relations of East Timor